2001 Gopalganj Roman Catholic church bombing on 1 June 2001, a bomb exploded at Gopalganj Roman Catholic church bombing resulting in the death of 10 people and the injury of 26 people.

Background 
Bangladesh is a Muslim majority country where the catholic population is .3 percent of the population. Religiously motivated attacks against the Christian community had been described as "rare".

Attack 
The bombs exploded at the Catholic church at Banaripara of Gopalganj district. Ten people were killed at the explosion. Gopalganj is the home District of then Prime Minister of Bangladesh Sheikh Hasina. The Police suspected Islamists. The church was holding its weekly prayers when the bomb went off.

Investigation 
According to media reports Shaikh Abdur Rahman the leader of the terrorist group Jamaat-ul-Mujahideen Bangladesh confessed to the police that his group was behind the bombing of the church. Mufti Abdul Hannan chief of Harkatul Jihad al-Islami (Huji) Bangladesh was taken into remand over the bombing.

Reactions 
Michael Rosario the Archbishop of the Roman Catholic Church in Bangladesh described the attack as "barbaric" and hoped the government would find the perpetrators.

References

History of Bangladesh (1971–present)
Terrorist incidents in Bangladesh in 2001
Terrorist incidents in Bangladesh
Islamic terrorist incidents in 2001
Improvised explosive device bombings in Asia
Mass murder in 2001
2001 murders in Bangladesh
Massacres of Christians
Gopalganj District, Bangladesh
Church bombings by Islamists
Terrorism in Bangladesh